General Motors Foundation, Inc. was a 501(c)(3) organization and the philanthropic vehicle of General Motors from its establishment in 1976 until its termination in 2017.

Charities funded by the foundation included Safe Kids Worldwide, College for Creative Studies, and the Belle Isle Conservancy.

In 2017, General Motors eliminated the General Motors Foundation and now funds its charitable giving directly from the corporation. Jackie Parker, head of the organization, resigned in July 2017.

References

1976 establishments in Michigan
2017 disestablishments in Michigan
General Motors